Magdolna Komka, née Csábi (born 1 August 1949) is a retired Hungarian high jumper. She finished seventh at the 1970 European Indoor Championships and fourth at the 1972 European Indoor Championships. She became Hungarian champion in 1968, 1969, 1970 and 1972.

She also competed in the women's high jump at the 1968 Summer Olympics and the 1972 Summer Olympics.

References

1949 births
Living people
Hungarian female high jumpers
Athletes (track and field) at the 1968 Summer Olympics
Athletes (track and field) at the 1972 Summer Olympics
Olympic athletes of Hungary
20th-century Hungarian people